Audrey Nkamsao Mbonda (born 28 July 1989) is a Cameroonian athlete competing in the 400 metres and 400 metres hurdles.

Her personal bests are 54.28 seconds in the 400 metres and 58.17 in the 400 metres hurdles.

Competition record

Personal bests
Outdoors
400 metres – 54.28 (Genève 2012)
400 metres hurdles – 58.17 (Genève 2015)
Indoors
400 metres – 54.96 (Aubiére 2012)

References

Living people
Cameroonian female sprinters
Cameroonian female hurdlers
1989 births
Athletes (track and field) at the 2015 African Games
African Games competitors for Cameroon
21st-century Cameroonian women